The Mexecutioner! The Best of Brujeria is the name of a best of compilation album by Brujeria released in 2003 by Roadrunner Records. The liner notes are written by Hank Williams III.

Track listing
"Pura de Venta" (Pure for Sale) – 0:41
"Leyes Narcos" (Cops) – 1:08
"Matando Gueros" (Killing White People) – 2:23
"Castigo del Brujo" (Punishment of the Wizard) – 1:43
"Sacrificio" (Sacrifice) – 1:16
"Padre Nuestro" (Our Father) – 2:13
"Raza Odiada/Hated Race (Pito Wilson)" – 3:30
"La Ley de Plomo" (The Law of Lead) – 2:46
"Colas de Rata" (Rat Tails) – 1:33
"Hechando Chingasos (Greñudos Locos II)" – 3:34
"La Migra (Cruza la Frontera II)" (Border Patrol [Cross the Border II]) – 1:43
"Consejos Narcos" (Drug Counseling) – 2:39
"Brujerizmo" (Witching) – 3:51
"Vayan Sin Miedo" (Go Without Fear) – 2:17
"Pititis, Te Invoco" (Pititis, I Invoke You) – 2:23
"Laboratorio Cristalitos" (Meth Lab) – 1:34
"Division del Norte" (Northern Division) – 3:55
"Anti-Castro" – 2:34
"El Desmadre" (The Excess) – 1:40
"Ritmos Satánicos" (Satanic Rhythms) – 6:55

Credits
Juan Brujo - vocals
Asesino - guitars, bass, tambor
Jr. Hozicon - voice on "Raza Odiada/Hated Race (Pito Wilson)"
Cristo de Pisto - guitars, sound effects
Fantasma - bass, vocals
Güero Sin Fe - guitars, bass
Greñudo - drums
Hongo - guitars, bass, drums
Pinche Peach - vocals
Pititis - female vocals

Brujeria (band) albums
2003 greatest hits albums